Otford railway station serves Otford in Kent. Train services are provided by Southeastern and Thameslink.

History
The first station at Otford opened on 1 June 1874. It was located at the point where the lines to Bat & Ball and Maidstone diverge. It was purely an exchange station, with no access for the villagers of Otford. The station closed on 1 November 1880. The current Otford station opened on 1 August 1882. It was renamed Otford Junction in 1904, reverting to its original name on 7 July 1929. The station had two through platforms and a bay platform, which was used by shuttle trains to Sevenoaks (Tubs Hill). The yard had two sidings, one of which served a goods shed. Freight facilities were withdrawn on 7 May 1962.

Services 
Services at Otford are operated by Thameslink and Southeastern using ,  and  EMUs.

The typical off-peak service in trains per hour is:
 1 tph to 
 1 tph to London Charing Cross
 2 tph to London Blackfriars via 
 2 tph to 

During the peak hours, the station is served by an additional hourly service between London Victoria and Ashford International.

In addition, the service to London Blackfriars is extended to and from  via  during the peak hours.

On Sundays, the services between London Charing Cross and Maidstone East do not run.

Gallery

References

Sources

External links 

Railway stations in Kent
DfT Category D stations
Former London, Chatham and Dover Railway stations
Railway stations in Great Britain opened in 1874
Railway stations in Great Britain closed in 1880
Railway stations in Great Britain opened in 1882
Railway stations served by Southeastern
Buildings and structures in Sevenoaks District
Railway stations served by Govia Thameslink Railway